I-4 was an Imperial Japanese Navy  J1 type  submarine commissioned in 1929. She was a large cruiser submarine that served in the Second Sino-Japanese War and World War II. During the latter conflict she operated in support of the attack on Pearl Harbor, conducted anti-shipping patrols in the Indian Ocean, supported the Indian Ocean raid, and took part in the Aleutian Islands campaign, Guadalcanal campaign, and New Guinea campaign before she was sunk in December 1942.

Construction and commissioning
Built by Kawasaki at Kobe, Japan, I-4 was laid down on 17 April 1926. She was launched on 22 May 1928 and was completed and commissioned on 24 December 1929.

Service history

1929–1937
Upon commissioning, I-4 was attached to the Yokosuka Naval District and assigned to Submarine Division 7. Sources differ on whether Submarine Division 7 was assigned at the time to the Yokosuka Defense Division in the Yokosuka Naval District or to Submarine Squadron 2 in the 2nd Fleet, a component of the Combined Fleet. On 1 August 1930, when Submarine Division 8 was created, I-4 and her sister ship  were placed in the new division. On 1 December 1930, Submarine Division 8 began duty with Submarine Squadron 1 in the 1st Fleet, a component of the Combined Fleet. The division was reassigned to the Yokosuka Defense Division in the Yokosuka Naval District on 1 October 1931, but it began another tour of duty in Submarine Squadron 1 in the 1st Fleet on 1 December 1931. I-4 was off Kyushu near the Mishima Islands taking part in an exercise in which a group of submarines practiced a mock combined attack on a line of zigzagging battleships on 14 June 1932 when she unexpectedly surfaced in front of the battleships. The battleship , making , took evasive action at the last minute and managed to avoid a direct collision with the stationary I-4, although Hyūga suffered minor damage to her hull plating when her bow grazed I-4′s hull.

Submarine Division 8 completed its assignment to Submarine Squadron 1 on 1 October 1932 and again was assigned to the Yokosuka Defense Division in the Yokosuka Naval District, but it returned to duty in Submarine Squadron 1 in the 1st Fleet on 15 November 1933. The six submarines concluded the cruise with their return to Sasebo on 4 April 1935. On 15 November 1935, Submarine Division 8 again returned to the Yokosuka Defense Division in the Yokosuka Naval District, and that day I-4 was placed in reserve.

Submarine Division 8 returned to service in Submarine Squadron 1 in the 1st Fleet on 1 December 1936. On 27 March 1937, I-4 departed Sasebo in company with I-1, I-2, I-3, I-5, and I-6 for training in the vicinity of Tsingtao, China. The six submarines concluded the training cruise with their arrival at Ariake Bay on 6 April 1937.

Second Sino-Japanese War
On 7 July 1937 the first day of the Marco Polo Bridge Incident took place, beginning the Second Sino-Japanese War. In September 1937 Submarine Squadron 1 was reassigned to the 3rd Fleet, which in turn was subordinated to the China Area Fleet for service in Chinese waters. From Hong Kong, the submarines began operations in support of a Japanese blockade of China and patrols of China′s central and southern coast.

Submarine Squadron 1 was based at Hong Kong until the autumn of 1938. In an effort to reduce international tensions over the conflict in China, Japan withdrew its submarines from Chinese waters in December 1938.

1939–1941

Submarine Division 8 was placed in Third Reserve in the Yokosuka Naval District on 15 November 1939. The division was resubordinated on 15 November 1940 to Submarine Squadron 2 in the 6th Fleet, a component of the Combined Fleet. On 7 January 1941, I-4 became flagship of Submarine Division 8. She briefly was in reserve from 19 to 31 October 1941.

On 10 November 1941 — by which time I-4, I-5, I-6, and the submarine  made up Submarine Division 8, with I-7 serving as squadron flagship — the commander-in-chief of the 6th Fleet, Vice Admiral Mitsumi Shimizu, gathered the commanding officers of the fleet′s submarines together for a meeting aboard his flagship, the light cruiser , which was anchored in Saeki Bay. His chief of staff briefed them on the upcoming attack on Pearl Harbor, which would bring Japan and the United States into World War II. As the Imperial Japanese Navy began to deploy for the upcoming conflict in the Pacific, I-4, I-5, I-6, and I-7 got underway from Yokosuka on 16 November 1941, bound for the Hawaiian Islands. The submarines received the message "Climb Mount Niitaka 1208" from the Combined Fleet on 2 December 1941, indicating that war with the Allies would commence on 8 December 1941 Japan time, which was on 7 December 1941 on the other side of the International Date Line in Hawaii.

World War II

First war patrol
On 7 December 1941, the submarines of Submarine Squadron 2 took up patrol stations across a stretch of the Pacific Ocean from northeast to northwest of Oahu, with I-4′s patrol area adjacent to that of I-6. The submarines had orders to conduct reconnaissance in the area and attack any ships which sortied from Pearl Harbor during or after the attack, which occurred that morning. Hųegh Merchant — which had been on a voyage from San Francisco, California, to Manila in the Philippines with 7,500 tons of general cargo including 100 tons of explosives and when the war broke out and had been diverted to Honolulu, Hawaii — caught fire, and at around 04:05 I-4 fired another torpedo which hit her near the same place as the first. Hųegh Merchant sank at 05:33, and the United States Navy destroyer minesweeper  rescued her passengers and crew. Oil barrels from Hųegh Merchant′s cargo drifted ashore on Kauai a number of days later.

On 9 January 1942, I-4 was ordered to divert from her patrol and search for the United States Navy aircraft carrier , which the submarine  had sighted, but she did not find Lexington. She arrived at Kwajalein on 22 January 1942, then got back underway on 24 January 1942 bound for Yokosuka, which she reached on 2 February 1942.

Second war patrol
While I-4 was at Yokosuka, Submarine Squadron 2 — consisting of I-1, I-2, I-3, I-4, I-6, and the squadron flagship, I-7 — was assigned to the Dutch East Indies Invasion Force on 8 February 1942. Accordingly, I-4 departed Yokosuka on 12 February 1942 bound for Palau, where she arrived on 16 February 1942, then got back underway on 17 February bound for the Netherlands East Indies. She arrived at Staring Bay on the Southeast Peninsula of Celebes just southeast of Kendari on 22 February 1942, then put back to sea on 23 February, heading for the Indian Ocean south of Java, where she was to conduct her second war patrol.

At about 16:15 on 28 February 1942, I-4 sank an unidentified Allied steamship — sometimes identified as the Singapore-based Dutch 1,693-gross register ton merchant steamer , although Ban Ho Guan may have not been in the area at the time — in the Indian Ocean southwest of Bali. She bombarded the Cocos Islands on 3 March, and concluded her patrol with her arrival at Penang in Japanese-occupied British Malaya at 12:50 Japan Standard Time on 8 March 1942.

Third war patrol
Orders arrived from the headquarters of the Combined Fleet for all the submarines of Submarine Squadron 2 except for I-1 to conduct reconnaissance operations along the coast of Ceylon and western coast of India in preparation for Operation C, the upcoming Indian Ocean raid by the aircraft carriers of the Combined Fleet′s Mobile Force. Accordingly, I-4 departed Penang on 28 March 1942 with the commander of Submarine Division 8 embarked and with orders to conduct a reconnaissance in the Indian Ocean of Eight Degree Channel and the waters off Colombo, Ceylon.

At the western entrance of Eight Degree Channel at about 15:55 on 6 April 1942 — the day after Japanese carrier planes raided Colombo — I-4 fired two Type 96 torpedoes at the American 6,617-ton steamer , which was on a voyage from Suez, Egypt, to Colombo. Fire soon engulfed the ship, and she had taken on a 25-degree list to port when her crew of 29 and two passengers abandoned ship at 16:05. Washingtonian eventually sank.

I-4′s patrol ended with her arrival at Singapore on 16 April 1942. She departed Singapore on 21 April 1942 to head for Yokosuka, which she reached on 1 May 1942.

Fourth war patrol

While I-4 was at Yokosuka, the Aleutian Islands campaign began on 3–4 June 1942 with a Japanese air raid on Dutch Harbor, Alaska, followed quickly by the unopposed Japanese occupation in the Aleutian Islands of Attu on 5 June and Kiska on 7 June 1942. On 10 June 1942, I-1, I-2, I-3, I-4, I-5, I-6, and I-7 were reassigned to the Northern Force for duty in the Aleutians, and on 11 June 1942 I-4 set out for Aleutian waters in company with I-1, I-2, I-3, and I-7 to begin her fourth war patrol. I-4 remained on the patrol line until 3 July 1942. On 20 July 1942, she was reassigned to the Advance Force and ordered to return to Japan. She arrived at Yokosuka on 1 August 1942 and began an overhaul.

Guadalcanal campaign

During I-4′s stay at Yokosuka, the Guadalcanal campaign began on 7 August 1942 with U.S. amphibious landings on Guadalcanal, Tulagi, Florida Island, Gavutu, and Tanambogo in the southeastern Solomon Islands. On 20 August 1942, Submarine Division 8 was disbanded, and I-4 was reassigned to Submarine Division 7. On 8 September 1942 she departed Yokosuka to head to the Solomons war zone and, after calling at Truk from 15 to 19 September 1942, set out for her fifth war patrol, assigned a patrol area south of San Cristobal.

At 23:44, she fired two Type 96 torpedoes at Alhena and at 23:51 observed the first torpedo hit Alhena′s stern near No. 5 hold, blowing a  hole open on either side of her stern and igniting several fires. The second torpedo also hit, but did not explode. She broke contact with Monssen at 00:25 on 30 September 1942. At 00:47 her sound operator reported contact with another destroyer, but I-4 soon lost this contact as well. She surfaced at 01:45 and at 04:32 reported that she had sunk a 7,000-ton cargo ship. However, although Alhena suffered six U.S. Navy and 24 United States Marine Corps personnel killed or missing she remained afloat, and in mid-1943 returned to combat reconfigured as an attack cargo ship, redesignated AKA-9.

On 5 October 1942, I-4 was reassigned to the "A" patrol group. On 10 October 1942, she and I-7 were resubordinated directly to the Advance Force and she received orders to divert from her patrol and proceed to the Espiritu Santo area, where a submarine-launched raid was scheduled to take place. The raid was cancelled, and I-4 was again assigned to the "A" patrol group on 13 October 1942. On 14 October 1942, she received orders to bombard the airfield on Espiritu Santo, but encountered limited visibility as she approached the island from the east and could not find the airfield. On 16 October 1942, she was ordered to patrol in the waters between the Solomon Islands and the New Hebrides. She returned to Truk on 3 November 1942.

While at Truk, I-4 underwent a conversion between 4 and 16 November 1942 in which her after  gun was replaced with a mounting abaft her conning tower for a waterproof Daihatsu-class landing craft that would allow her to discharge cargo along coastlines in the Solomon Islands, and she was reassigned to the "B" patrol unit on 15 November 1942. As her conversion was being completed, the commander of the 6th Fleet, Vice Admiral Teruhisa Komatsu, addressed a meeting of the commanding officers of his fleet′s submarines on 16 November 1942 to inform them that the commander-in-chief of the Combined Fleet, Admiral Isoroku Yamamoto, had ordered the 6th Fleet to organize a system of supply runs to the 17th Army forces fighting on Guadalcanal via submarine.

Assigned to these supply missions, I-4 departed Truk on 20 November 1942 bound for Rabaul. She stopped at Rabaul from 23 to 25 November 1942 and embarked a waterproof Daihatsu on her new mounting, then proceeded to Shortland Island in the Shortland Islands, her commanding officer receiving a briefing on supply procedures at Guadalcanal while she was at sea off Bougainville. She reached Shortland on 26 November 1942. Carrying her Daihatsu, she departed on 28 November with a cargo of 20 tons of food and medicine and reached Kamimbo Bay on the northwest coast of Guadalcanal on 30 November 1942. She quickly unloaded the Daihatsu and got back underway for Rabaul, which she reached on 3 December 1942. On 5 December 1942 at 16:00, she began another supply run to Guadalcanal, again carrying 20 tons of food and medicine, which she unloaded quickly at Kamimbo Bay on 8 December 1942 before stopping at Shortland Island from 10 to 12 December and then moving on to Rabaul, which she reached on 14 December 1942.

New Guinea campaign

On 16 December 1942, I-4 departed Rabaul on an urgent supply run to Buna, New Guinea, to support Japanese forces fighting in the New Guinea campaign. She arrived off the mouth of the Mambare River on the coast of New Guinea at 22:15 on 18 December 1942, but while she was on the surface the U.S. Navy PT boats PT-121 and PT-122 detected her. The PT boats fired two torpedoes at her, both of which missed, but they forced her to withdraw. She returned to the area a few hours later, but was unable to contact Japanese forces on shore. Her commanding officer transmitted a message saying that he had decided to abort the supply mission and return to Rabaul.

Loss

Misidentifying I-4 as an I-168-class submarine, Seadragon described her as painted black and with the number "4" painted on her conning tower. I-4′s lookouts apparently sighted the approaching torpedoes because I-4 turned in an apparent attempt to comb their wakes. Seadragon′s first torpedo suffered a gyroscope failure and missed ahead and her second torpedo detonated prematurely after running for only 18 seconds. Her third torpedo struck I-4′s stern, resulting in a ball of flames and much smoke.

On 5 January 1943, the Imperial Japanese Navy officially declared I-4 to be presumed lost with all hands off Rabaul. She was stricken from the Navy list on 1 March 1943.

References

Footnotes

Bibliography
Boyd, Carl, and Akihiko Yoshida. The Japanese Submarine Force and World War II. Annapolis, Maryland: Naval Institute Press, 1995. .
Ruhe, William J. War in the Boats: My WWII Submarine Battles. Washington, D.C.: Brassey's, Inc., 1994. .

Junsen type submarines
Ships built by Kawasaki Heavy Industries
1928 ships
Second Sino-Japanese War naval ships of Japan
World War II submarines of Japan
Attack on Pearl Harbor
Ships of the Aleutian Islands campaign
Japanese submarines lost during World War II
Submarines sunk by United States warships
Maritime incidents in 1932
Maritime incidents in December 1942
World War II shipwrecks in the Pacific Ocean
Ships lost with all hands
Ships sunk by American submarines
Submarines sunk by submarines